Erika Mária Szűcs (born April 2, 1951) is a Hungarian politician and economist, who served as Minister of Social Affairs and Labour from May 5, 2008 to April 14, 2009 in the second cabinet of Prime Minister Ferenc Gyurcsány. She was a member of the National Assembly of Hungary from August 27, 2004 to May 5, 2014.

At the end of 2010 she joined Democratic Coalition Platform founded by Gyurcsány and became a member of its leadership. When the platform split from the Hungarian Socialist Party (MSZP) on October 22, 2011 she joined to newly formed party and left the MSZP and its parliamentary group.

References

External links
Szűcs Erika országgyűlési adatlapja 
Életrajz a Szociális és Munkaügyi Minisztérium honlapján 
Szűcs Erika életrajza az MSZP honlapján 

1951 births
Living people
Politicians from Budapest
Members of the Hungarian Socialist Workers' Party
Hungarian Socialist Party politicians
Democratic Coalition (Hungary) politicians
Government ministers of Hungary
Women members of the National Assembly of Hungary
Members of the National Assembly of Hungary (2002–2006)
Members of the National Assembly of Hungary (2006–2010)
Members of the National Assembly of Hungary (2010–2014)
Women government ministers of Hungary
21st-century Hungarian women politicians